Estádio Presidente Vargas can refer to:

Estádio Presidente Vargas (Ceará), a football stadium located in Fortaleza, Ceará, Brazil
Estádio Presidente Vargas (Paraíba), a football stadium located in Campina Grande, Paraíba, Brazil